RCOS, Rcos or rCOS may refer to:

Royal College of Surgeons in Ireland
Royal College of Surgeons of England
Royal College of Surgeons of Edinburgh
RC Optical Systems
Rcos (trigonometric function), an archaic trigonometric function
rCOS (computer sciences), a model in computer sciences